Hernán Matías Salazar (born 2 May 1990 in Isidro Casanova) is an Argentine football striker currently playing for San Martín Formosa.

Career
Salazar made his professional debut in a 1-1 draw with Gimnasia de Jujuy on September 20, 2008. In 2010, he was a non-playing member of the squad that won the Clausura 2010 championship.

External links
Profile at Soccerway
 Argentine Primera statistics

1990 births
Living people
People from La Matanza Partido
Argentine footballers
Association football forwards
Argentinos Juniors footballers
Argentine Primera División players
Sportspeople from Buenos Aires Province